Nigel Stephenson (born 12 October 1950), also known by the nicknames of "Nij", and "Stivvy", is an English former professional rugby league footballer who played in the 1960s, 1970s and 1980s, and coached in the 1980s and 1990s.

Background
Nigel Stephenson was born in Dewsbury, West Riding of Yorkshire, England.

Playing career

International honours
Nigel Stephenson played left-, i.e. number 4, in England's 0–25 defeat by Australia in the 1975 Rugby League World Cup Final at Headingley Rugby Stadium, Leeds on Wednesday 12 November 1975.

County honours
Nigel Stephenson was selected for Yorkshire County XIII on ten occasions.
and scored 9 tries and won the county championship a record 5 times along with the late David Topliss.

Championship final appearances
Nigel Stephenson played left-, i.e. number 4, was captain, and scored a try, 4-goals and a drop goal in Dewsbury's 22–13 victory over Leeds in the Championship Final during the 1972–73 season at Odsal Stadium, Bradford on Saturday 19 May 1973.also won the championship with Bradford northern two years running 1980/81 1981/1982. second time as captain.

BBC2 Floodlit Trophy Final appearances
Nigel Stephenson played , and scored a goal in Dewsbury's 2–22 defeat by St. Helens in the 1975 BBC2 Floodlit Trophy Final during the 1975–76 season at Knowsley Road, St. Helens on Tuesday 16 December 1975.

John Player Trophy Final appearances
Nigel Stephenson played , and scored a drop goal in Bradford Northern's 6–0 victory over Widnes in the 1979–80 John Player Trophy Final during the 1979–80 season at Headingley Rugby Stadium, Leeds on Saturday 5 January 1980.

Career records
Nigel Stephenson holds Dewsbury's career goalscoring record, 863-goals scored during his two spells with the club 1967–78 and 1984–86.

Family
Nigel Stephenson is the father of the rugby league footballer Francis Stephenson, his other son James is a highly regarded Community Coach with Shaw Cross Sharks & Dewsbury Rams and in 2010 James was awarded the RFL Kirklees Coach of the Year Award for his outstanding efforts in rugby league development.

Nigel Stephenson is not related to fellow Dewsbury 1973 Rugby Football League Championship winner Mike "Stevo" Stephenson.

References

External links
Shaw Cross Sharks – Hall of Fame
Diamond day for Shaw Cross' star production line
Dewsbury Rams – Honours & Records
Dewsbury Rams – History
Playing at Smales pace sank champions
Photograph "Neil Fox" at rlhp.co.uk
Photograph "Stephenson about to touch down" at rlhp.co.uk
Photograph "Stephenson scores Northern's second" at rlhp.co.uk
Photograph "Ronnie Firth sprays the champagne" at rlhp.co.uk (upside down)
Photograph "Peter Fox shows the Championship Trophy to youngsters." at rlhp.co.uk
Photograph "Jimmy and Nigel parade the Trophy" at rlhp.co.uk
Photograph "The Mayor shows off the Trophy" at rlhp.co.uk (upside down)
Photograph "Northern Off Half Stephenson" at rlhp.co.uk
Photograph "The 1981 squad pictured at Odsal" at rlhp.co.uk
Photograph "1981 team v. Hull" at rlhp.co.uk
Photograph "Stephenson Stretchered Off" at rlhp.co.uk
Photograph "Nigel Stephenson In Action" at rlhp.co.uk
Photograph "Nigel Stephenson Scores" at rlhp.co.uk
Photograph "Forsyth about to crash through" at rlhp.co.uk
Photograph "Return to Odsal" at rlhp.co.uk
Photograph "Trevor kisses the turf" at rlhp.co.uk

1950 births
Living people
Bradford Bulls players
Carlisle RLFC coaches
Carlisle RLFC players
Dewsbury Rams players
England national rugby league team players
English rugby league coaches
English rugby league players
Huddersfield Giants coaches
Hunslet R.L.F.C. coaches
Rugby league centres
Rugby league players from Dewsbury
Wakefield Trinity players
York Wasps players
Yorkshire rugby league team players